Shmarya Yehuda-Leib Medalia (1872, Vegery, Lithuania – April 26, 1938, Moscow) was the chief rabbi of Moscow between 1933 and 1938.

Biography

Shmarya Yehuda-Leib Yankelevich Medalia was born to a family of Lubavitcher Hasidim. He was an alumnus of the original Slabodka yeshiva.

Between 1899 and 1903, he served as the rabbi of Tula, Russia; and between 1905 and 1917, in Vitebsk. In 1910 he participated in the All-Russian Rabbinic Congress. In 1912, he took part in the Agudat Israel congress in Katowice, Poland. Between 1927 and 1931, he again served in Tula. In 1933, he received the appointment to serve as the rabbi of the Choral Synagogue in Moscow. In 1938, he was accused in court of communicating with Lubavitcher rebbe Yosef Yitzchok Schneersohn, and with German agents; also with corrupting the youth. Upon conviction, he was shot and buried in the common tomb in the Kommunarka proving ground.

Rabbi Shmaryahu's son Rabbi Hillel Medaliah was Chief Rabbi of Antwerp.

He was posthumously exonerated in twenty years. Rabbi Pinchas Goldschmidt, who held the post of the rabbi of Moscow in 1991, presented the Choral Synagogue with a parokhet or ark curtain, in memory of Rabbi Medalia.  

1872 births
1938 deaths
Chabad-Lubavitch rabbis
Chief rabbis of Russia
Russian Hasidic rabbis
Rabbis from Moscow